Evangelos Kontogoulidis (born 13 July 1981) is a Greek former professional footballer.

Career

Kozani
Kontogoulidis scored nine goals for Kozani during the 2004–05 Gamma Ethniki season. He signed for PAS Giannina in January 2006.

PAS Giannina
Evangelos Kontogoulidis in PAS Giannina, played with the former flag striker Georgios Saitiotis. On 31 January 2007, Evangelos Kontogoulidis scored in the extra-time a goal from before a hostile crowd in Karaiskaki Stadium, PAS Giannina clinched a spot in the Greek Cup semifinals. With an aggregate score of 3–2, PAS also became the first ever lower division club to eliminate Olympiacos from the Greek Cup tournament. In the season 2008/2009 Evangelos Kontogoulidis helped PAS Giannina to achieve the Greek Super League, allowing the epirus team to face teams like Olympiacos, Panathinaikos, PAOK FC, AEK Athens, Panionios. In the season 2009/2010 Evangelos Kontogoulidis with PAS Giannina reach the second Greek Cup semi-final, knockout round of the Greek Cup against dell'Atromitos, team coached by Giorgos Donis former flag of the team of Epirus. On 2 February 2010, the PAS Giannina at the Zosimades Stadium inflicts 4–0 to PAOK FC of Italians Bruno Cirillo, Mirko Savini and other players like Zisis Vryzas and Theodoros Zagorakis, that they have played in Italy. Where the European goalkeeper Kostas Chalkias, that won Euro 2004 with Greece, could not stop the Ianotes strikers and PAS Giannina will face Panathinaikos in the Greek Cup semi-final for the second time in the history of the club's main city of Ioannina.

Trikala
In the summer 2010, he moved for one year to Trikala in Greek Second Division, here he made 31 appearances and 11 goal.

Panthrakikos
In the summer 2011, he moved for one year to Panthrakikos, still in Greek Second Division, he helped the team to promote to the Greek Super League. Here in the summer 2012, the club decide to put forward with him the striker Dimitrios Papadopoulos, one of the strikers that won Euro 2004 with Greece, in order to reinforce the attack to compete in Greek Super League. On 16 December 2013, he scored a goal against Apollon Smyrni to draw the result in the Greek Cup.

Panachaiki
In the summer 2013, he moved to Panachaiki.

Chalkidonikos A.C.

In October 2016, he moved to Chalkidonikos A.C.

Honours
PAS Giannina
Greek Second Division (1): 2009

Panthrakikos
Greek Second Division (1): 2012

References

External links
 Guardian Football
 Profile at Onsports.gr
 Evangelos Kontogoulidis
 Evangelos Kontogoulidis Profile

1981 births
Living people
Greek footballers
PAS Giannina F.C. players
Trikala F.C. players
Association football forwards
Footballers from Ptolemaida